David Jeremy Hone (born 30 June 1946) is an Australian former sportsman who played first-class cricket with Oxford University and Australian rules football for Melbourne in the Victorian Football League (VFL).

Hone spent the 1969 VFL season with the Melbourne Football Club as an amateur, and played 18 of a possible 20 games during year, mostly as a defender.

An honours graduate from Monash University, Hone chose to continue his studies in England and became a student at Worcester College, Oxford, in 1970. His father Brian Hone had been a famous educator.

He made three first-class cricket appearances for the university in 1970, as an opening bowler. The first was against Hampshire, who were being captained by former West Indian Test cricketer Roy Marshall. In a drawn match, Hone took the wicket of Hampshire opener Richard Lewis but managed no further dismissals from his 36 overs. He went wicket-less from his two other first-class matches, against Worcestershire and Nottinghamshire, to finish with a disappointing average of 284.

Hone returned to Australia in 1971 and although he began training again with Melbourne, he never played another VFL game.

He would have a highly successful career in secondary education, both as a Headmaster and teacher. During the early 1980s he was the Head of History at Melbourne Grammar and from 1986 until 1993 served as the Headmaster of Scotch Oakburn College in Launceston. In 1994 he joined Adelaide's Westminster School as Principal and remained in that position until 1999. He was then the Head of the Senior School at Beaconhills College before retiring and taking up a role with the University of the Third Age.

References

External links

1946 births
Living people
Australian cricketers
Oxford University cricketers
Melbourne Football Club players
Australian headmasters
Monash University alumni
Australian rules footballers from Melbourne
Cricketers from Melbourne
Alumni of Worcester College, Oxford